Taramis was an Australian heavy metal group, which began as Prowler in 1983. Initially they played covers of other artists' work; in 1985 they developed more original material and changed their name. By that time their line-up was Dave Browne on drums, Shane "Joel" Southby on lead vocals, Danny Komorr on bass guitar, and Craig Robertson on lead guitar. Their debut album, Queen of Thieves, was released in August 1987. A second album followed in April 1992, Stretch of the Imagination, and the group supported Brazilian band Sepultura at their Melbourne concert in July. Taramis disbanded early in 1993. Australian rock music historian Ian McFarlane noted they were "one of the first local groups to play a brand of 'progressive' heavy metal in the style of overseas acts ... Taramis infused its esoteric music with an epic, mystical feel. Man-mountain frontman Joel Southby also possessed a booming rock voice which added an edge to the band's billowing, blustering song arrangements".

History
In 1983 Taramis were formed as Prowler in Melbourne with the line-up of Joe Cordina on drums, Danny Komorr on bass guitar, Mick "Lights" Cawthan on lead guitar, Craig Robertson on lead guitar, and Shane "Joel" Southby on lead vocals. Initially Prowler played cover versions of Iron Maiden and Manowar material. Cawthan was replaced by Andrew Rigo on guitar but Rigo left soon after. In 1985 Cordina was replaced on drums by Dave Browne, the group were playing more original material and changed their name to Taramis – from the 1984 film Conan the Destroyer.

In late 1986, the band recorded their debut album, Queen of Thieves, which appeared on the Metal for Melbourne record label in August 1987. It was produced and engineered by George Simak (Black Jack). Before its release Komorr was replaced on bass guitar by Evan Harris. The group toured interstate and signed with United States label, Metal Blade, to issue the album in North America in the following year.

Early in 1990 Robertson left and was replaced by George Larin (ex-New Religion, Nothing Sacred) on lead guitar. Larin added a "more inventive and forceful playing style to the band's sound". In April 1992 their second album, Stretch of the Imagination, was released on Rising Sun Productions. It was recorded at Oasis Studios with Doug Saunders (Mass Confusion) producing. In July that year they supported Brazilian band Sepultura at their Melbourne concert.

Taramis disbanded early in 1993. Australian rock music historian Ian McFarlane noted they were "one of the first local groups to play a brand of 'progressive' heavy metal in the style of overseas acts ... Taramis infused its esoteric music with an epic, mystical feel. Man-mountain frontman Joel Southby also possessed a booming rock voice which added an edge to the band's billowing, blustering song arrangements".

Southby moved to Sydney and eventually became a member of Merv Brewer Steel Guitar Band. He later moved to New Zealand. Larin developed his own self-titled project. In 2000 Browne joined Clauz, a three-piece metal group, which released an album, Strict Regime, in 2002. In December 2008, Harris, who had been a member of Black Majesty and Endel Rivers, played bass guitar for Steve Turner, an Australian progressive rock guitarist, with Turner's album due in mid-2009. On 6 January 2009 Dave Browne died, at the age of 44 years; Taramis reunited in June to play a benefit concert in Browne's honour. Also that month both albums were re-released by My Graveyard Records with bonus tracks.

References

General
  Note: Archived [on-line] copy has limited functionality.
Specific

Australian progressive metal musical groups
Musical groups established in 1983
Musical groups disestablished in 1993
Musical groups from Melbourne
Australian power metal musical groups
Australian heavy metal musical groups